Oh You're So Silent Jens is a compilation album by Swedish indie pop musician Jens Lekman. It was first released on Service on 8 June 2005, and later re-released on 22 November 2005 on Secretly Canadian. The album is composed of previously released tracks taken from Maple Leaves (2003), Rocky Dennis in Heaven (2004), and Julie (2004), as well as "F-Word" (2003) from a CD distributed in the fanzine En Garde and "The Wrong Hands" (2004) from the Accelerator compilation.

The album cover was designed by the Swedish musician Rasmus Hägg, one half of the duo Studio.

Critical reception

Oh You're So Silent Jens received widespread acclaim from contemporary music critics. At Metacritic, which assigns a normalized rating out of 100 to reviews from mainstream critics, the album received an average score of 79, based on 13 reviews, which indicates "generally favorable reviews".

Amy Phillips of Pitchfork gave the album a very positive review, stating, "Oh You're So Silent Jens, his new collection of previously released singles and B-sides, is a marvel of pure songcraft. Clichés unravel, traditional structures break down and build back up again, unpretentious witticisms sparkle. And then there are the sonics of the thing: lo-fi Phil Spector room dividers of sound, unexpected samples, and Lekman's rich, cavernous monotone."

Track listing

Credited samples
 "Maple Leaves" (in both versions) incorporates a sample of "Someone to Share My Life With" by the Television Personalities.
 "Black Cab" incorporates a sample of "Mary Jo" by Belle & Sebastian.
 "A Sweet Summer's Night on Hammer Hill" incorporates a sample from the bootleg "Emmaboda 2003" recorded by Patrik Lindgren.
 "F-Word" incorporates a sample of "Kate Moss" by Arab Strap.

Personnel
Credits for Oh You're So Silent Jens adapted from liner notes.

 Jens Lekman – writing, performance, engineering, production, recording
Additional personnel

 Linda Andersson – violin
 Emma Bates – backing vocals
 Marcus Cato – trumpet
 Markus Görsch – drums
 Rasmus Hägg – artwork and design
 Ellen Hjalmarsson – violin

 Patrik Lindgren – engineering
 Ulrika Mild – backing vocals
 Lilian Olsson – backing vocals
 Mikaela Robsahm – cello
 Jacob Stålhammar – mastering

References

Jens Lekman albums
2005 compilation albums
Secretly Canadian compilation albums
Service (record label) compilation albums